Threshold Nunatak is an isolated nunatak located at the mouth of Tillite Glacier, 5 nautical miles (9 km) northeast of Portal Rock, in Queen Alexandra Range. The name was suggested by John Gunner of the Ohio State University Geological Expedition, 1969–70, who was landed by helicopter to collect a rock sample here. The name is in association with Portal Rock and also reflects the location at the mouth of Tillite Glacier.

Nunataks of the Ross Dependency
Shackleton Coast